Henry Winkler is an American actor.

Henry Winkler may also refer to:

Henry R. Winkler (1916–2012), American academic and college administrator

See also
Heinrich August Winkler (born 1938), German historian
Harry Winkler (disambiguation)
Henry Winkles (1801–1860), English architectural illustrator, engraver and printer